Sara Hurwitz is an Open Orthodox Jewish spiritual leader. She is considered by some to be the first female Orthodox rabbi. She serves as "Rabba" at the Hebrew Institute of Riverdale, and the president and co-founder of Yeshivat Maharat, both in Riverdale, New York.

Biography
Hurwitz was born in South Africa, and moved to Boca Raton, Florida with her family in 1989. She earned a B.A. from Barnard College and a certificate from the Drisha Institute for Women.

In June 2009, Sara Hurwitz was ordained by Rabbi Avi Weiss with the title "Maharat". In February 2010, Weiss announced that he was changing the title to "Rabba", a move criticised by both Agudath Yisrael and the Rabbinical Council of America.

Within several years of Hurwitz's ordination, subsequent Orthodox women also received ordination as well as positions within Orthodox synagogues. This development indicated that Hurwitz was no longer an exception within Orthodox Judaism.

On Dec. 6th, 2010, at Conservative Temple Reyim in Newton, MA, Sara Hurwitz met with Amy Eilberg, the first Conservative rabbi, Sally Priesand, the first Reform female rabbi, and Sandy Eisenberg Sasso, the first Reconstructionist female rabbi. They and approximately 30 other women rabbis lit Chanukah candles and then spoke about their experiences in an open forum.

On June 3, 2012, Priesand, Sasso, Eilberg, and Hurwitz met again, this time at Monmouth Reform Temple at a celebration honoring the four first women rabbis to be ordained in their respective denominations, and the 40th anniversary of Priesand's ordination.

Recognition
In 2013, Hurwitz was awarded the Hadassah Foundation Bernice S. Tannenbaum prize. The following year, Hurwitz received the annual Myrtle Wreath Award from the Southern New Jersey Region of Hadassah, and in 2016 she received the Trailblazer Award at UJA Federation of New York.

Hurwitz was named as one of Jewish Weeks 36 Under 36, the Forwards 50 most influential Jewish leaders, and Newsweeks 50 most influential rabbis.

The art exhibit “Holy Sparks”, which opened in February 2022 at the Heller Museum and the Skirball Museum, featured 24 Jewish women artists, who had each created an artwork about a female rabbi who was a first in some way. Kathryn Jacobi created the artwork about Hurwitz.

See also 
 Regina Jonas
 Dina Brawer
 Shira Marili Mirvis
 Timeline of women rabbis

References 

Living people
American Modern Orthodox rabbis
Barnard College alumni
People from Johannesburg
South African emigrants to the United States
South African Orthodox rabbis
People from Boca Raton, Florida
Open Orthodox Jews
Year of birth missing (living people)
2010 in Judaism
Orthodox Jewish feminists
21st-century American rabbis
Orthodox women rabbis